The governor of Tyumen Oblast is the highest official of Tyumen Oblast, a federal subject of Russia.

History of office 
From 1991 to 1993 the head of the regional administration was appointed by the decree of the president of Russia. After the Charter of Tyumen Oblast was adopted (1995), the office of governor was introduced, elected by popular vote of the entire Tyumen Oblast population, including KhMAO and YaNAO. The first election was held in 1996. From 2005 to 2012, governor was not elected, but appointed by the Tyumen Oblast Duma on the proposal of the federal president.

List of officeholders

References 

Politics of Tyumen Oblast
 
Tyumen